Eucalyptus paniculata, commonly known as grey ironbark, is a species of tree that is endemic to New South Wales. It has dark-coloured, deeply furrowed ironbark on the trunk and branches, lance-shaped to curved adult leaves, flower buds in groups of seven on a branched peduncle, white flowers and conical, hemispherical or cup-shaped fruit.

Description
It has grey to black or brownish, deeply furrowed ironbark on the trunk and branches. Flowering occurs in most months and the flowers are white.

Taxonomy and naming 
Eucalyptus paniculata was first formally described in 1797 by James Edward Smith in Transactions of the Linnean Society of London from material collected by David Burton at Port Jackson. Smith obtained the specimens from the herbarium of Joseph Banks. The specific epithet (paniculata) is from the Latin word paniculatus meaning paniculate, referring to the arrangement of the flowers.

Distribution and habitat 
Grey ironbark grows in high rainfall coastal areas from Bermagui to Bulahdelah. Previously a common tree in the inner western suburbs of Sydney. A remnant ironbark still grows in the inner city suburb of Glebe at St. Johns church.

Uses 
A very dense timber, being 1120 kilograms per cubic metre. Heart wood is red-brown or dark brown. The timber has various uses, including railway sleepers, heavy engineering, construction, poles and cross-arms. Timber is difficult to plane and nail. It is slow in drying, requiring careful handling to avoid surface checking. Annual wood production potential is 9 to 18 cubic metres per hectare. The timber is not susceptible to the lyctus borer.

Gallery

References 

paniculata
Myrtales of Australia
Flora of New South Wales
Plants described in 1797
Taxa named by James Edward Smith